Móvil may refer to:

Edwin Móvil (born 1986), Colombian footballer
América Móvil, Mexican telecommunication company headquartered in Mexico City, Mexico
Colombia Móvil, the third largest mobile phone company in Colombia
CTI Movil or Claro Argentina, Paraguay and Uruguay, mobile network operator with headquarters in Córdoba, Argentina

See also
Columna Móvil Teófilo Forero, Revolutionary Armed Forces of Colombia or FARC, a Marxist–Leninist revolutionary guerrilla organization
Movial
Movila (disambiguation)
Moville
Noville (disambiguation)